Costantino Rocca (born 4 December 1956) is an Italian golfer. He was long known as the most successful male golfer that Italy has produced, until the 2018 success of Francesco Molinari, who credited Rocca as an inspiration to him following his Open victory. After a long career on the European Tour, Constantino is now playing on the European Seniors Tour. He has five European Tour wins and is best known for his second-place finish in the 1995 Open Championship, and his hole in one in 1995 Ryder Cup.

Career outline
Rocca was born in Almenno San Bartolomeo, Bergamo. He started out as a caddie, winning the Italian Caddie Championship in 1978, and turned professional in 1981 at the age of 24.

In the 1980s, Rocca struggled to retain a European Tour card and made several trips to the Qualifying School. He began to make major strides in his career in 1990, which was the first season that he finished high enough on the Order of Merit to gain a tour card automatically. By 1993, he had risen to sixth in the Order of Merit, and his two best seasons were 1995 and 1996, when he finished fourth. He won five titles on the tour, the first of which was the 1993 Open de Lyon and the most prestigious of which was the 1996 Volvo PGA Championship.

In the final round of the 1995 Open Championship, Rocca sank a 60-foot (18-metre) putt on the 18th at St Andrews to make birdie and force a four-hole playoff with John Daly, but Daly won the playoff by four strokes. Rocca's second-highest finish in a major was a tie for fifth in the 1997 Masters Tournament; he was in the final pairing on Sunday, having begun the final round in second place, nine shots behind 21-year-old Tiger Woods, and he finished fifteen behind Woods.

Rocca was the first Italian to play for Europe in the Ryder Cup, and remained the only Italian to do so until 2010, when Francesco Molinari qualified for the Ryder Cup held in Celtic Manor and Edoardo Molinari was a captain's pick. He appeared in 1993, 1995 and 1997, and had a 6–5–0 win–loss–half record, including 1 win and 2 losses in singles matches.  That one singles win came in a crucial match against Tiger Woods in the 1997 Ryder Cup at Valderrama, which Rocca won 4 & 2 to help Europe claim the cup.  The victory against Woods was one of Woods' first losses in singles play.  His 53% winning record in the Cup is one of the best in European team history. During the 1995 Ryder Cup, Rocca made a hole-in-one on Oak Hill's sixth hole, only the third ace in Ryder Cup history. In 1999, Rocca almost qualified for the Ryder Cup again after he won the West of Ireland Golf Classic.

The 2001 European Tour season was the last in which Rocca finished inside the top hundred on the Order of Merit, though the remained exempt through 2006 due to his 1996 Volvo PGA Championship win. He made his European Seniors Tour debut at the 2007 Sharp Italian Seniors Open, and won his first senior tournament two weeks later at the Irish Seniors Open. He ended 2008 with a record seven top finishes and ranked ninth in the Order of Merit. His best placing was tied third in the Azores Senior Open.

Rocca played his last European Tour event in 2015 at the Italian Open, an event he played in 33 times but never won.

Personal life
Rocca is married and has two children, Francesco and Chiara.

In 2008, Rocca opened his own golf academy, the Costantino Rocca Golf Academy, at Golf Club Gerre Losone in Switzerland.

He is friends with golfing great Gary Player and plays in his Gary Player Invitational charity event to help raise money for underprivileged children around the world.

Professional wins (17)

European Tour wins (5)

1Dual-ranking event with the Challenge Tour

European Tour playoff record (1–1)

Challenge Tour wins (2)

1Dual-ranking event with the European Tour

Other wins (6)
1984 Nazionale Open
1985 Enichem Open
1986 Pinetina Open
1988 Rolex Pro-Am (Switzerland)
1989 Nazionale Open, Italian PGA Championship

European Senior Tour wins (2)

European Senior Tour playoff record (0–1)

Other senior wins (3)
2008 Senior Italian PGA Championship
2010 Senior Italian PGA Championship
2011 Senior Italian PGA Championship

Playoff record
PGA Tour playoff record (0–1)

Japan Golf Tour playoff record (0–1)

Results in major championships

CUT = missed the half-way cut
"T" = tied

Summary

Most consecutive cuts made – 4 (1996 U.S. Open – 1997 Masters)
Longest streak of top-10s – 1 (three times)

Results in The Players Championship

CUT = missed the halfway cut
"T" indicates a tie for a place

Team appearances
Hennessy Cognac Cup (representing Italy): 1984
Alfred Dunhill Cup (representing Italy): 1986, 1987, 1989, 1991, 1992, 1996, 1999
Europcar Cup (representing Italy): 1988
World Cup (representing Italy): 1988, 1990, 1991, 1992, 1993, 1994, 1995, 1996, 1998, 1999
Ryder Cup (representing Europe): 1993, 1995 (winners), 1997 (winners)

References

External links

Costantino Rocca Golf Academy
Constantino Rocca: La dolce vita for the man who tamed Tiger Woods
Facebook page

Italian male golfers
European Tour golfers
European Senior Tour golfers
Ryder Cup competitors for Europe
Sportspeople from Bergamo
1956 births
Living people